Aimo Kaarlo Cajander first's cabinet was the eighth Government of Republic of Finland. Its time period was from June 2, 1922 to November 14, 1922. It was a caretaker government.
 

 

Cajander, 1
1922 establishments in Finland
1922 disestablishments in Finland
Cabinets established in 1922
Cabinets disestablished in 1922